5-hydroxyfuranocoumarin 5-O-methyltransferase (furanocoumarin 5-methyltransferase, furanocoumarin 5-O-methyltransferase, bergaptol 5-O-methyltransferase, bergaptol O-methyltransferase, bergaptol methyltransferase, S-adenosyl-L-methionine:bergaptol O-methyltransferase, BMT, S-adenosyl-L-methionine:5-hydroxyfuranocoumarin 5.1-O-methyltransferase) is an enzyme with systematic name S-adenosyl-L-methionine:5-hydroxyfurocoumarin 5-O-methyltransferase. This enzyme catalyses the following chemical reaction

 (1) S-adenosyl-L-methionine + a 5-hydroxyfurocoumarin  S-adenosyl-L-homocysteine + a 5-methoxyfurocoumarin (general reaction)
 (2) S-adenosyl-L-methionine + bergaptol  S-adenosyl-L-homocysteine + bergapten

The enzyme methylates the 5-hydroxy group of some hydroxy- and methylcoumarins, such as 5-hydroxyxanthotoxin.

References

External links 
 

EC 2.1.1
Coumarins metabolism
O-methylated phenylpropanoids metabolism